The Dickens Opera House, at 300 Main St. in Longmont, Colorado, was built in 1881 and expanded in 1905.  It was listed on the National Register of Historic Places in 1987, and was included as a contributing building in the 2017-designated Downtown Longmont Historic District.

It is a two-story brick "19th Century Commercial style" building, prominent in Longmont at the northeast corner of Third Avenue and Main Street.

It was built by William Henry Dickens, a relative of author Charles Dickens, who came to the area in 1860.

It is significant historically as "Longmont's social and cultural center and meeting hall for other community events."

Originally it held the Farmer's National Bank on the first floor and its auditorium on the second floor.  It was vacant from 1978 to 1986.

References

Downtown Longmont Historic District
National Register of Historic Places in Boulder County, Colorado
Buildings and structures completed in 1881
Opera houses